Ramón Trabal Calvo (20 September 1903 - 24 April 1947) was a Spanish footballer who played as a midfielder.

A historical member of Espanyol in the 1920s, he was one of the first footballers to play for Espanyol for his entire career, and thus to be part of the so-called one-club men group.

Club career
Born in Barcelona, he began playing football in the lower categories of Espanyol, before making it to the first team in 1922, for whom he was a starter until his departure in 1933. He formed a brilliant midfield line with Pere Solé and Tena I. He played a pivotal role in helping the club to win the 1928-29 Catalonia championship and reach the 1929 Copa del Rey Final, which Espanyol won after beating Real Madrid 2-1.

After retiring, he became the club's first-team coach for two seasons. He was also one of the key figures in the club's survival during the Civil War. He died in 1947, at the age of 42, after a long illness.

International career
Trabal never made it to the Spain national football team, but he played for the Catalonia national team, helping them win the 1923-24 Prince of Asturias Cup, an inter-regional competition organized by the RFEF. Trabal was a starter in the infamous final of the 1923-24 edition against a Castile/Madrid XI, which ended in a dramatic 4-4 draw; however, he did not play in the ensuing replay two days later where Catalonia came-out as 3-2 winners.

Honours

Club
Espanyol
 Copa del Rey: 1929

International
Catalonia
 Prince of Asturias Cup: 1923-24 Prince of Asturias Cup

References

1903 births
1947 deaths
Footballers from Barcelona
Spanish footballers
Association football midfielders
RCD Espanyol footballers
La Liga players
Catalonia international footballers